The 9th round of the inaugural British Formula 3000 Championship, saw the series return to Brands Hatch, on 10 September. Going into this, the final round, the championship was being led by Gary Brabham (46 pts.), separated by just one point from Andrew Gilbert-Scott (45 pts.)

Report

Entry
A total of 11 F3000 cars were entered for this, the final round of the 1989 British F3000 Championship.

Qualifying
Andrew Gilbert-Scott took pole position for Eddie Jordan Racing team in their Cosworth-engined Reynard 88D. He was joined on the front row by championship leader, Gary Brabham in a similar Reynard, prepared by Bromley Motorsport.

Race
The race was held over 27 laps of the Brands Hatch Grand Prix circuit. The race was stopped on lap six, following an accident involving Andrew Gilbert-Scott. This effectively handed Gary Brabham the title. Brabham would go on and win the restarted race for the Bromley Motorsport team, driving their Reynard-Cosworth 88D. The Aussie won in a time of 35:09.83mins., averaging a speed of 119.782 mph. Second place went to Perry McCarthy in GA Motorsport’s Lola-Cosworth T88/50, who was nearly 25secs behind. Third went to Marco Greco who completed the podium for Eddie Jordan Racing in his Cosworth engined Reynard 88D.

Classification

Race

Class winners in bold

 Fastest lap: Gary Brabham, 1:16.04secs. (123.077 mph)

References

British Formula 3000 Championship